Hamblin and Porter's School was a private school in South Mall, Cork City, Ireland. Its pupils came mainly from merchant classes and Church of Ireland backgrounds. Students pursued classical subjects, with many students matriculated at Trinity College Dublin.

Daniel Hamblin's school, at 58 George's Street, Cork, was founded in 1824. Hamblin was known as a teacher preparing students for university entrance exams, and he also taught at the Cork Mechanics Institute. Hamblin's school moved in 1826, forming Hamblin and Porter’s boarding and day school, 73 South Mall, Cork. The premises consisted of a school-room, 2 classrooms, library, 2 dormitories, a dressing room and a playground. Sometimes the school's address was listed as Queens Street (now Father Mathew Street), off South Mall. In 1855, the school and pupils moved to 19 South Mall, to become the Collegiate School under Francis William Newell.

Hamblin was made a freeman of Cork City.

Classical subjects were taught. A report card for a pupil grades him in Greek Testament, Lucian, Homer, Xenophon, Latin, Terence, Juvenal, Livy, Virgil, Horace, Exercise, Euclid (Geometry), Algebra, History and Writing.

Past pupils
Notable pupils include, physician Robert Spencer Dyer Lyons, Home Rule MP Joseph Philip Ronayne, balladeer, writer and nationalist Denny Lane, mathematician, theologian and Trinity provost George Salmon DD, FRS, and surgeon and professor Edward Hallaran Bennett MD.

Victoria Cross winner James Adams, archbishop of Ontario John Lewis, and clergymen Adam Newman Beamish and Richard Parkes Bennett are among the Church of Ireland clergy who attended the school.

References

Education in Cork (city)
Defunct schools in the Republic of Ireland
1824 establishments in Ireland
Educational institutions established in 1824